The 1993 MTV Movie Awards was hosted by Eddie Murphy.

Performers
Dr. Dre (featuring Snoop Dogg) — "Nuthin' but a 'G' Thang"
Duran Duran — "Ordinary World"
Rod Stewart — "Have I Told You Lately"
Stone Temple Pilots — "Plush"

Awards

Best Movie 
A Few Good Men
Aladdin
Basic Instinct
The Bodyguard
Malcolm X

Best Male Performance
Denzel Washington – Malcolm X
Kevin Costner – The Bodyguard
Tom Cruise – A Few Good Men
Michael Douglas – Basic Instinct
Jack Nicholson – A Few Good Men

Best Female Performance
Sharon Stone – Basic Instinct
Geena Davis – A League of Their Own
Whoopi Goldberg – Sister Act
Whitney Houston – The Bodyguard
Demi Moore – A Few Good Men

Most Desirable Male
Christian Slater – Untamed Heart
Kevin Costner – The Bodyguard
Tom Cruise – A Few Good Men
Mel Gibson – Lethal Weapon 3
Jean-Claude Van Damme – Nowhere to Run

Most Desirable Female
Sharon Stone – Basic Instinct
Kim Basinger – Cool World
Halle Berry – Boomerang
Madonna – Body of Evidence
Michelle Pfeiffer – Batman Returns

Breakthrough Performance
Marisa Tomei – My Cousin Vinny
Halle Berry – Boomerang
Whitney Houston – The Bodyguard
Kathy Najimy – Sister Act
Rosie O'Donnell – A League of Their Own

Best On-Screen Duo
Mel Gibson and Danny Glover – Lethal Weapon 3
Sharon Stone and Michael Douglas – Basic Instinct
Whitney Houston and Kevin Costner – The Bodyguard
Tom Cruise and Nicole Kidman - Far and Away
Woody Harrelson and Wesley Snipes – White Men Can't Jump

Best Villain
Jennifer Jason Leigh – Single White Female
Danny DeVito – Batman Returns
Ray Liotta – Unlawful Entry
Jack Nicholson – A Few Good Men
Sharon Stone – Basic Instinct

Best Comedic Performance
Robin Williams – Aladdin
Whoopi Goldberg – Sister Act
Eddie Murphy – Boomerang
Bill Murray – Groundhog Day
Joe Pesci – My Cousin Vinny

Best Song from a Movie
Whitney Houston — "I Will Always Love You" (from The Bodyguard)
Boyz II Men — "End of the Road" (from Boomerang)
Sting and Eric Clapton — "It's Probably Me" (from Lethal Weapon 3)
Peabo Bryson and Regina Belle — "A Whole New World" (from Aladdin)
Alice in Chains — "Would?" (from Singles)

Best Kiss
Christian Slater and Marisa Tomei – Untamed Heart
Pauline Brailsford and Tom Hanks – A League of Their Own
Michelle Pfeiffer and Michael Keaton – Batman Returns
Winona Ryder and Gary Oldman – Bram Stoker's Dracula
Mel Gibson and Rene Russo – Lethal Weapon 3
Woody Harrelson and Wesley Snipes – White Men Can't Jump

Best Action Sequence
Mel Gibson's Motorcycle Crash – Lethal Weapon 3
Aliens Chase Through Tunnel – Alien 3
Plane Crash – Alive: The Miracle of the Andes
Oklahoma Land Race – Far and Away
Helicopter Explosion – Under Siege

Best New Filmmaker
Carl Franklin – One False Move

Lifetime Achievement Award
 The Three Stooges

References

External links
1993 MTV Movie Awards Official Site

 1993
Mtv Movie Awards